Renfrew is a small ghost town in the Canadian province of Nova Scotia, located in  The Municipality of the District of East Hants in Hants County.  This village was the site of some of the most successful gold mines in the Maritimes.

Edmond Henry Horne of Enfield, Nova Scotia, apprenticed here, learning his trade in the Renfrew gold mines before going on to establishing the great Noranda, a mining and metallurgy company originally from Rouyn-Noranda, Quebec, Canada.

References
Secondary Sources
Mike Parker. 2009. Gold Rush: Ghost Towns of Nova Scotia. Pottersfield Press.
John Hawkins. 1995. Renfrew Gold: The Story of a Nova Scotia Ghost Town. Lancelot Press.

Endnotes

Links

Renfrew on Destination Nova Scotia

Communities in Hants County, Nova Scotia
General Service Areas in Nova Scotia